The Audimax is a lecture hall located on the University of Hamburg campus in Rotherbaum, Hamburg, Germany, in the district of Eimsbüttel. It is the largest lecture hall in Hamburg. The 1,674-seat auditorium also hosts non-university events such as concerts and cinema.

History
Notable past performers include Van Halen, Black Sabbath, AC/DC, The Firm, Steve Hackett and B.B. King.

References

University of Hamburg
Buildings and structures in Eimsbüttel
Concert halls in Germany